Glory Days or Glory Daze may refer to:

Art, entertainment, and media

Films
 Glory Days (1988), a TV movie starring Robert Conrad and Pamela Gidley
 Glory Daze (film) (1996), an American film
 Glory Daze: The Life and Times of Michael Alig (2015), a biographical crime documentary film about Michael Alig and his Club Kids
 an alternate title for the 1976 film Goldenrod

Music
 Glory Days (Little Mix album), 2016
 Glory Days (The Amity Affliction album), 2010
 "Glory Days" (Just Jack song)
 "Glory Days" (Bruce Springsteen song)

Television
 Glory Days (1990 TV series), a 1990 American drama series
 Glory Days (2002 TV series), a 2002 American mystery series
 Glory Daze (TV series), a 2010 American comedy-drama series

Other art, entertainment, and media
 Glory Days (audio drama), a Doctor Who spin-off audio drama
 Glory Days (musical), a 2008 Broadway show
 Super Army War (2005), a Game Boy Advance game titled Glory Days: The Essence of War in Europe

See also
 Days of Glory, films